Lilian Ridgewell (19 October 1912 – July 1997) was a British gymnast. She competed in the women's artistic team all-around event at the 1936 Summer Olympics.

References

1912 births
1997 deaths
British female artistic gymnasts
Olympic gymnasts of Great Britain
Gymnasts at the 1936 Summer Olympics
Sportspeople from London